Scanian is an East Scandinavian dialect spoken in the province of Scania in southern Sweden. Present-day speakers of "Scanian" speak the Scanian dialect of Swedish. Older Scanian formed part of the old Scandinavian dialect continuum and are by most historical linguists considered to be an East Danish dialect group, but due to the modern-era influence from Standard Swedish in the region and because traditional dialectology in the Scandinavian countries normally has not considered isoglosses that cut across state borders, the Scanian dialects have normally been treated as a South Swedish dialect group in Swedish dialect research. However, many of the early Scandinavian linguists, including Adolf Noreen and G. Sjöstedt, classified it as "South Scandinavian", and some linguists, such as Elias Wessén, also considered Old Scanian a separate language, classified apart from both Old Danish and Old Swedish.

Status 
There has been active campaigning from local Scanian interest groups to promote Scanian as a separate language on par with the official minority languages, though this has been rejected by Swedish authorities. Swedish linguists generally view Scanian as just one of many local or regional Swedish (or Scandinavian) dialects, some of which differ considerably from Standard Swedish but don't meet the criteria of a separate language.

Scanian was originally classified as a separate language in ISO 639-3, but was declassified as a language in 2009.  A request for reinstatement was submitted during the 2009 annual review process, but rejected on the grounds of mutual intelligibility; it is listed in ISO 639-6 with code scyr.

With the establishment of the Scanian Academy and with recent heritage conservation programs, funded by Region Skåne and the Swedish Government, there is a renewed interest in the region for Scanian as a cultural language and as a regional identity, especially among younger generations of Scanians. Many of the genuine rural dialects have been in decline subsequent to the industrial revolution and urbanization in Sweden.

The population of Scania make up around 13.5% of the total population in Sweden.

History 
Swedish and Danish are considered to have been the same dialect, Old East Norse, up until the 12th century. However, some scholars speculate that there might have been certain dialect differences within the Nordic language area as early as the Proto-Nordic period. The term Swedish is not mentioned specifically in any source until the first half of the 14th century, and no standard spoken language had developed in either Sweden or Denmark before 1500, although some scholars argue that there may have been tendencies towards a more formal "courteous" language among the aristocracy.

Scanian appeared in writing before 1200, at a time when Swedish and Danish had yet to be codified, and the long struggle between Sweden and Denmark over the right to claim the Old Scanian manuscripts as an early form of either of the two national state languages has led to some odd twists and turns. Two Scanian fragments dated to around 1325 were initially claimed to be (younger) Old Swedish, but further research in modern times has claimed that the language was not Swedish, but Scanian. During the 20th century the fragments were thus relabeled early Old Danish by Scandinavian linguists, and as explained by Danish linguist Britta Olrik Frederiksen, the fragments are now thought to "represent as such a newly claimed territory for the history of the Danish language". Like the Scanian Law, one of the fragments, a six-leaf fragment (catalogued as SKB A 120), is written in the runic alphabet. The place of writing, according to Frederiksen, has been tentatively identified as the Cistercian monastery at Herrevad Abbey in Scania. The fragment contains a translation of Mary's lament at the cross. The other fragment (catalogued as SKB *A 115) is a bifolium with just over a hundred metrical lines of knittelvers, a translation from Latin of the apocryphal gospel Evangelium Nicodemi about Christ's descent into hell and resurrection.

In modern Scandinavian linguistic research, the assertion that Old Scanian was a Swedish dialect before the Swedish acquisition of most of old Skåneland is now seldom argued by linguistic scholars, although the comparative and historical research efforts continue.

One of the artifacts sometimes referred to as support for the view of Scanian as separate from both the Swedish and Danish language is a letter from the 16th century, where the Danish Bible translators were advised not to employ Scanian translators since their language was not "proper Danish".

Language politics 
After the Treaty of Roskilde in 1658, the former Danish provinces of Blekinge, Halland and Scania became a Swedish dominion, but they were allowed to keep their old privileges, laws and customs. However, from the 1680s, a process of Swedification was introduced, including a switch of languages used in churches and restrictions imposed on cross-border travel and trade. The situation in Scania was unique from a linguistic point of view; modern sociolinguistic studies often approach it as a way to study the roots of linguistic nationalism.

As pointed out by the Norwegian scholar Lars S. Vikør, professor, Nordic and Linguistics Studies, University of Oslo, in the 2001 book Language and Nationalism, the "animosity between the two countries [Sweden and Denmark], and the relative closeness of their standard languages (dialectal differences within each of the two countries were greater than [between] the two standards), made it imperative to stress the difference between them in the standardization process". According to Vikør, the "Swedish treatment of the Scanians perhaps shows [that] the most important element of the [linguistic nationalism] ideology is the desire to stress the difference from another linguistic entity that in some way may be considered threatening or challenging one's own autonomy."

In Scania, the Swedish government officially limited the use of Scanian in 1683 by nullifying the self-rule granted in the Treaty of Roskilde and the Malmö Recess of 1662, where Scania had been granted the right to a certain degree of autonomy including preservation of its old laws and customs. Scania became fully integrated into the Swedish Kingdom in 1719, and the assimilation has accelerated during the 20th century, with the dominance of Standard Swedish-language radio and television, urbanization, and movement of people to and from the other regions of Sweden.

Bornholm was once part of Skåneland but rebelled and returned to Denmark in 1659. The Scanian dialect of Bornholm remained in use as a functioning transitional stage, but Standard Danish soon became dominant in official contexts, and the dialect is thought to be disappearing.

Historic shifts 
The gradual transition to Swedish has resulted in the introduction of many new Swedish characteristics into Scanian since the 18th century, especially when it comes to vocabulary and grammar. In spite of the shift, Scanian dialects have maintained a non-Swedish prosody, as well as details of grammar and vocabulary that in some aspects differ from Standard Swedish. The prosody, pronunciation of vowels and consonants in such qualities as length, stress and intonation has more in common with Danish, German and Dutch (and occasionally English) than with Swedish. The degree of contrast between Scanian dialects and standard Swedish is sometimes in the popular press compared to the differences between British English and Australian English.

However, as pointed out by the researchers involved in the project Comparative Semantics for Nordic Languages, it is difficult to quantify and analyze the fine degrees of semantic differences that exist between the Scandinavian languages in general, even between the national languages Danish, Swedish and Norwegian: "[S]ome of the Nordic languages [..]are historically, lexically and structurally very similar.[...]Are there systematic semantic differences between these languages? If so, are the formal semantic analytic tools that have been developed mainly for English and German sufficiently fine-grained to account for the differences among the Scandinavian languages?"

The characteristic Scanian diphthongs, which do not occur in Danish or Swedish, are popularly often to be signs of Scanian natives' efforts to adapt from a Danish to a "proper" Swedish pronunciation. However, linguists reject that  explanation for the sound change, but there is no universally-accepted theory for why the sound changes occur.

Research that provides a cross-border overview of the spectrum of modern dialects in the Nordic region has recently been initiated through the Scandinavian Dialect Syntax Project, based at the University of Tromsø, in Norway, in which nine Scandinavian research groups collaborate for the systematic mapping and studying of the syntactic variation across the Scandinavian dialect continuum.

Historic preservation 
Scanian once had many unique words which do not exist in either Swedish or Danish. In attempts to preserve the unique aspects of Scanian, the words have been recorded and documented by the Institute for Dialectology, Onomastics and Folklore Research in Sweden. Preservation is also accomplished by comparative studies such as the Scanian-Swedish-Danish dictionary project, commissioned by the Scanian Academy. This project is led by Helmer Lång and involves a group of scholars from different fields, including Birger Bergh, linguistics, Inger Elkjær and Inge Lise Pedersen, researcher of Danish dialects. 

Several Scanian dictionaries have been published over the years, including one by Sten Bertil Vide, who wrote his doctoral thesis on the names of plants in South Swedish dialects. This publication and a variety of other Scanian dictionaries are available through the Department of Dialectology and Onomastics in Lund.

Phonology 
Scanian realizes the phoneme  as a uvular trill  in clear articulation, but everyday speech has more commonly a voiceless  or a voiced uvular fricative , depending on phonetic context. That is in contrast to the alveolar articulations and retroflex assimilations in most Swedish dialects north of Småland.

The realizations of the highly variable and uniquely Swedish fricative  also tend to be more velar and less labialized than in other dialects. The phonemes of Scanian correspond to those of Standard Swedish and most other Swedish dialects, but long vowels have developed into diphthongs that are unique to the region. In the southern parts of Skåne, many diphthongs also have a pharyngeal quality, similar to Danish vowels.

Vocabulary 
Scanian used to have many words which differed from standard Swedish. In 1995 Skånska Akademien released Skånsk-svensk-dansk ordbok, a dictionary with 2,711 Scanian words and expressions. It should be mentioned however that not all of these words are in wide use today. While the general vocabulary in modern Scanian does not differ considerably from Standard Swedish, a few specifically Scanian words still exist which are known in all of Scania, occurring frequently among a majority of the speakers. These are some examples:
 alika, "jackdaw" (Standard Swedish: kaja, Danish: allike)
 elling, "duckling" (Standard Swedish: ankunge, Danish: ælling)
 hutta, "throw" (Standard Swedish: kasta, Danish: kaste)
 hoe, "head" (Standard Swedish: huvud, Danish: hoved)
 glytt, "very young boy"
 glyttig, "silly, frivolous" (Standard Swedish: tramsig)
 , "women, girl" (Standard Swedish: flicka)
 fjåne, "idiot". (Standard Swedish: fåne)
 fubbick, "idiot".
 grunna (på), think about (Standard Swedish: fundera or grunna, Danish: overveje)
 hiad, "(very) hungry for" (Standard Swedish: (mycket) sugen på, (poetic) Danish: hige efter)
 hialös, "impatient" (Standard Swedish: otålig, Danish: utålmodig or hvileløs (poetic))
 märr, "mare" (Standard Swedish: sto or more unusual märr, Danish: mare)
 mög, "dirt; excrements" (Standard Swedish: smuts, Danish: møg)
 mölla, "mill" (Standard Swedish: (väder-)kvarn, Danish: mølle)
 This word is used in many geographical names – Examples
 Möllevången, a neighbourhood in Malmö
 Svanemøllen, a station in Copenhagen
 Möllebacken (Scanian dialect) and Møllebakken (Danish) are names for countless number of hills, "Mill Hill" in English.
 pantoffel, "potato" (Standard Swedish: potatis, Danish: kartoffel)
 påg, "boy" (Standard Swedish: pojke, archaic Danish: poge / pog, standard Danish: dreng)
 rälig, "disgusting", "ugly", "frightening" (Standard Swedish äcklig, ful, skrämmande/otäck, former Swedish rädelig, dialect Danish: rærlig Danish: ulækkert, grim)
 rullebör, "wheelbarrow" (Standard Swedish: skottkärra, Danish: rullebør, trillebør)
 romma, "hit" (Standard Swedish: träffa, Danish: ramme or træffe)
 tradig, "boring" (Standard Swedish: tråkig or colloquial "tradig", Danish: træls/kedelig)
 tåcke, "cock, rooster" (Standard Swedish: tupp, Danish: hane)
 spann, "bucket" (Standard Swedish: hink or occasional "spann", Danish: spand)
 skobann or skoband, "shoelace" (Standard Swedish: skosnöre, Danish: snørebånd)
 syllten, "hungry" (Standard Swedish: hungrig, archaic Swedish svulten, Danish: sulten)
 tös, "girl" (Standard Swedish: flicka  or tös (archaic), Danish: pige or tøs)
 vann, "water" (Standard Swedish: vatten, Danish: vand)
 vindmölla, "wind turbine" (Standard Swedish: vindkraftverk, Danish: vindmølle)
 vång, "meadow" (Standard Swedish: äng, Danish: eng or (poetic) vang) (as in Möllevången, Malmö, "Mill Meadow")
 eda, "to eat" (Standard Swedish: äta, Danish: spise or æde (mostly used for animals))
 flabb, "mouth" (Standard Swedish: mun, Danish: mund or flab (an animal's mouth, but can also mean a mouthy person))
 fälleben, "to fall, to trip" (Standard Swedish: krokben, Danish: falde or spænde ben)

See also 
 Bornholmsk
 Jamtlandic
 Elfdalian
 Västgötska

Notes

References 
 Bandle, Oskar & Kurt Braunmüller et al., eds. (2002–2003) The Nordic Languages: An international handbook of the history of the North Germanic languages. Vol I. Berlin and New York: de Gruyter, 2002. xxvii + 1057 pp.
 Basbøll, Hans. "Prosody, productivity and word structure: the stød pattern of Modern Danish." Nordic Journal of Linguistics (2003), 26: 5–44 Cambridge University Press 
 Hallberg, Göran, 2003: "Kampen om skånskan." I: Språkvård 3/2003.
 Lång, Helmer (1991). "Den bortglömda skånska litteraturen" 333-årsboken om Skånelandsregionen 1658–1991. Eds. Assarsson & Broberg et al. Uddevalla: Settern, 1991.
 Lång, Helmer Skånska språket (Klippan 2002)
 Nordic Journal of Linguistics (2004), Vol 27, Issue 2. Cambridge University Press. .
 Lång, Helmer & Vide, Sten-Bertil Skånsk-svensk-dansk ordbok från A! till Örrrk! (1995) 
 Noreen, Adolf (1887). De nordiska språken.
 Nordisk familjebok (1917) article Skåne, page 1309
 Scandinavian Dialect Syntax. Project involving research groups at University of Tromsø, University of Iceland, University of Oslo, Norwegian University of Technology and Science (Trondheim), University of Aarhus, University of Copenhagen, Lund University, and University of Helsinki
 Sjöstedt, G. (1936). "Studier över r-ljuden i sydskandinaviska mål". Dissertation, Lund University.
 Sundquist, John D.(2003). "The Rich Agreement Hypothesis and Early Modern Danish embedded-clause word order." Nordic Journal of Linguistics (2003), 26:1, 233–258. Cambridge University Press. .
 Vide, S.-B. (1966). Sydsvenska växtnamn. Landsmålsarkivet, Lund.

Further reading 
 Germundsson, Tomas. "Regional Cultural Heritage versus National Heritage in Scania's Disputed National Landscape.International Journal of Heritage Studies, Vol. 11, No. 1, March 2005, pp. 21–37. (ISSN 1470-3610).
 Hall, Patrik. "The Social Construction of Nationalism. Sweden as an Example." (Lund, 1998). Doctoral Dissertation, 91-7966-525-X.

External links 
 Cum Linguis Scaniis – Scanian music, poetry and language
  – Scanian comparison to Swedish, Danish and English

Swedish dialects
Danish dialects
Scania